The Egongyan Bridge is a suspension bridge which crosses the Yangtze River in Chongqing, China. The connects Nan'an District east of the Yangtze River with Jiulongpo District to the west. Originally, the bridge was built with to be six lanes wide with a pedestrian walkway on each side but was expanded to eight lanes in 2013. The expansion removed the walkways. Pedestrian connectivity was restored in 2019 with the opening of the Egongyan Rail Transit Bridge upstream which has a pedestrian walkway.

See also
List of longest suspension bridge spans
Yangtze River bridges and tunnels

External links

 Photograph of Egongyan Bridge
 Photograph of the bridge at night
 Photos and location from Panoramio

References

Bridges in Chongqing
Bridges over the Yangtze River
Suspension bridges in China
Bridges completed in 2000